Lotus Flowers for Miss Quon (German: Lotosblüten für Miss Quon) is a 1967 thriller film directed by Jürgen Roland and starring Lang Jeffries, Francesca Tu and Werner Peters. Based on the 1961 novel A Lotus for Miss Quon by James Hadley Chase, it was made as a co-production between France, Italy and West Germany.

The film's sets were designed by the art director Peter Rothe. Location shooting took place around Hong Kong.

Cast
 Lang Jeffries as Mark Jason 
 Francesca Tu as Nhan Lee Quon
 Werner Peters as Charlie Lee 
 Daniel Emilfork as Inspector Gonsart 
 Sal Borgese as Jojo 
 François Cadet as Wade 
 Christa Linder as Stella 
 Luciana Paoli as Anita 
 Kam Re as Lam Than 
 Tam Tin a Grandfather 
 Gianni Rizzo as Blackie Lee 
 Mai Chang as Mistress 
 Dong Ham as Doctor 
 Van Tho Nguyen as General 
 My Lang To as Murdered Girlfriend 
 Ann Fai Wan as Taxi Girl

References

Bibliography 
 Peter Cowie. Variety International Film Guide. Tantivy Press, 1967.

External links 
 

1967 films
1960s thriller films
German thriller films
Italian thriller films
French thriller films
West German films
1960s German-language films
Films directed by Jürgen Roland
Gloria Film films
Films shot in Hong Kong
Films set in Hong Kong
Films based on British novels
Films based on works by James Hadley Chase
1960s German films
1960s Italian films
1960s French films